Leshchevka is a rural locality (a village) in Tiginskoye Rural Settlement, Vozhegodsky District, Vologda Oblast, Russia. The population was 39 as of 2002.

Geography 
Leshchevka is located 18 km west of Vozhega (the district's administrative centre) by road. Nikitinskaya is the nearest rural locality.

References 

Rural localities in Vozhegodsky District